Cytochrome P450 family 170 subfamily B member 1 (abbreviated CYP170B1) is an actinobacterial Cytochrome P450 enzyme originally from Streptomyces albus, which catalyzes the biosynthesis of the tricyclic sesquiterpene antibiotic albaflavenone.

References 

170
Prokaryote genes